The economy of Azerbaijan has completed its post-Soviet transition into a major oil-based economy (with the completion of the Baku-Tbilisi-Ceyhan Pipeline), from one where the state played the major role. The transition to oil production led to remarkable growth figures as projects came online; reaching 26.4% in 2005 (second highest GDP growth in the world in 2005 only to Equatorial Guinea) and 34.6% in 2006 (world highest) before subsiding to 10.8% and 9.3% in 2008 and 2009 respectively. The real GDP growth rate for 2011 was expected at 3.7% but had dropped to 0.1%.
Large oil reserves are a major contributor to Azerbaijan's economy. The national currency, the Azerbaijani manat, was stable in 2000, depreciating 3.8% against the dollar. The budget deficit equaled 1.3% of GDP in 2000.

Progress on economic reform has generally lagged behind macroeconomic stabilization. The government has undertaken regulatory reforms in some areas, including the substantial opening of trade policy, but inefficient public administration in which commercial and regulatory interests are commingled limit the impact of these reforms. The government has largely completed privatization of agricultural lands and small and medium-sized enterprises. In August 2000, the government launched a second-stage privatization program, in which many large state enterprises will be privatized. Since 2001, the economic activity in the country is regulated by the Ministry of Economy of Azerbaijan Republic.

Economic history of Azerbaijan

Modern era
Throughout the Soviet period, Azerbaijan had always been more developed industrially than Armenia and Georgia, two neighboring Transcaucasia countries but also less diversified, as a result of slow investment in the non-oil sector. With a history of industrial development of more than 100 years, Azerbaijan proved to be a leading nation in the Southern Caucasus throughout the turmoil of the Soviet Union collapse in the early 1990s until nowadays.

Republic era
Oil remains the most prominent product of Azerbaijan's economy with cotton, natural gas and agriculture products contributing to its economic growth over the last five years. More than $60 billion was invested into Azerbaijan's oil by major international oil companies in AIOC consortium operated by BP. Oil production under the first of these PSAs, with the Azerbaijan International Operating Company, began in November 1997 and now is about 500,000 barrels per day. People visit petroleum spas (or "oil spas") to bathe in the local crude in Naftalan A leading caviar producer and exporter in the past, Azerbaijan's fishing industry today is concentrated on the dwindling stocks of sturgeon and beluga in the Caspian Sea.

Azerbaijan shares all the problems of the former Soviet republics in making the transition from a command to a market economy, but its energy resources brighten its long-term prospects. Azerbaijan has begun making progress on economic reform, and old economic ties and structures are slowly being replaced. An obstacle to economic progress, including stepped up foreign investment, is the continuing conflict with Armenia over the Nagorno-Karabakh region.

In 1992, Azerbaijan became member of the Economic Cooperation Organization. In 2002, the Azerbaijani merchant marine had 54 ships. In March 2001, Azerbaijan concluded a natural gas agreement with Turkey, providing a future export market for Azerbaijan.

Azerbaijan has concluded 21 production-sharing agreements with various oil companies. An export pipeline that transports Caspian oil to the Mediterranean from Baku through Tbilisi, Georgia to Ceyhan, Turkey (the Baku-Tbilisi-Ceyhan Pipeline) became operational in 2006. The pipeline is expected to generate as much as $160 billion in revenues for the country over the next 30 years. The recent high price of oil is highly beneficial to Azerbaijan's economy as the nation is in the midst of an oil boom. Eastern Caspian producers in Kazakhstan also have expressed interest in accessing this pipeline to transport a portion of their production.

In 2010, Azerbaijan entered into the top eight biggest oil suppliers to EU countries with €9.46 billion. In 2011, the amount of foreign investments in Azerbaijan was $20 billion, a 61% increase from 2010. According to Minister of Economic Development of Azerbaijan, Shahin Mustafayev, in 2011, "$15.7 billion was invested in the non-oil sector, while the rest in the oil sector."

In 2012, because of its economic performance after the Soviet breakup, Azerbaijan was predicted to become "Tiger of Caucasus". In 2012, Globalization and World Cities Research Network study ranked Baku as a Gamma-level global city.

In 2015, Turkey and Azerbaijan agreed to boost mutual trade to US$15 billion by 2023.

Macro-economic trend

The following is a chart of trend of gross domestic product of Azerbaijan at market prices with figures in USD.

For purchasing power parity comparisons, the US dollar was exchanged at 1,565.88 Manats only. Currently, the new Manat is in use, with an exchange rate of about 1 manat = $1.10. Mean graduate pay was $5.76 per man-hour in 2010.

The following table shows the main economic indicators in 1980–2017.

Source: IMF

For more than a century the backbone of the Azerbaijani economy has been petroleum, which represented 50 percent of Azerbaijan's GDP in 2005, and is projected to double to almost 125 percent of GDP in 2007. Now that Western oil companies are able to tap deepwater oilfields untouched by the Soviets because of poor technology, Azerbaijan is considered one of the most important areas in the world for oil exploration and development. Proven oil reserves in the Caspian Basin, which Azerbaijan shares with Russia, Kazakhstan, Iran, and Turkmenistan, are comparable in size to the North Sea, although exploration is still in the early stages.

Sectors of the economy

Agriculture

Azerbaijan has the largest agricultural basin in the region. About 54.9 percent of Azerbaijan is agricultural lands. In the same year the total wood resources counted . Azerbaijan's agricultural scientific research institutes are focused on meadows and pastures, horticulture and subtropical crops, leaf vegetables, viticulture and wine-making, cotton growing and medicinal plants. In some lands it is profitable to grow grain, potatoes, sugar beets, cotton and tobacco. Livestock, dairy products, and wine and spirits are also important farm products. The Caspian fishing industry is concentrated on the dwindling stocks of sturgeon and beluga.

Some portions of most products that were previously imported from abroad have begun to be produced locally (among them are Coca-Cola by Coca-Cola Bottlers LTD, beer by Baki-Kastel, parquet by Nehir and oil pipes by EUPEC Pipe Coating Azerbaijan).

A new program which is prepared by the European Union is aimed to support the economic diversification of Azerbaijan. Program is considered for southern region Lankaran which has the lowest economic indicator and the lowest income per capita, as well as, the lowest level of investment, but at the same time, high potential for the production of garden products in high quality. The program will be focused on the development of the region at the local and international levels.

Azerbaijan produced in 2018:

 2.0 million tons of wheat;
 916 thousand tons of barley;
 898 thousand tons of potato;
 609 thousand tons of tomato;
 307 thousand tons of watermelon;
 277 thousand tons of sugar beet;
 277 thousand tons of apple;
 247 thousand tons of maize;
 235 thousand tons of onion;
 233 thousand tons of cotton;
 223 thousand tons of cucumber;
 167 thousand tons of grape;
 160 thousand tons of persimmon (5th largest world producer);
 108 thousand tons of cabbage;

In addition to smaller productions of other agricultural products, like melon (94 thousand tons), pear (52 thousand tons) and apricot (28 thousand tons).

Manufacturing

In 2007, mining and hydrocarbon industries accounted for well over 95 percent of the Azerbaijani economy. Diversification of the economy into manufacturing industries remains a long-term issue.

As of late 2000s, the defense industry of Azerbaijan has emerged as an autonomous entity with a growing defense production capability. The ministry is cooperating with the defense sectors of Ukraine, Belarus and Pakistan. Along with other contracts, Azerbaijani defence industries and Turkish companies, Azerbaijan will produce 40 mm revolver grenade launchers, 107 mm and 122 mm MLRS systems, Cobra 4×4 vehicles and joint modernization of BTR vehicles in Baku.

Services

Financial and business services

The GDP growth rates observed in Azerbaijan during the last years made the country one of the fastest growing economies in the world. But the banking sector of Azerbaijan has yet to tap the vast growth potential that should be achievable due to the continuation of the high economic growth. For this reason the banking sector remains small in relation to the size of the Azerbaijani economy. Since 2002, important stages of restructuring of the banking system have started to be carried out. Taking into consideration the entry of big oil revenues in the country, as a logical result of successful oil strategy, and in this base, as the banks were ready to an effective transfer of their financial resources to the strategic goals, development strategy was made for 2002–2005.

By 1 April 2010, 47 banks, 631 bank branches function in Azerbaijan. One of the banks was founded with the participation of state capital, 23 of foreign capital. To the same date, 98 non-bank credit organizations operate in the republic along with banks. Growth of real money incomes of population, development of trust in the bank system, improving the legal bases of protection of interests of creditors and depositors, in particular launch of 'Deposits Insurance Fund' were the criteria characterizing rapid growth of deposits of population. As of 1 April 2010, bank deposits of population were equal to 2,4 billion AZN. 33,3% of them were long-term deposits (higher than a year). As of 1 April 2010, bank credits to customers is 8.5 bn AZN, which makes 70.5% of bank assets. Special weight of private sector in structure of credit investments is higher than 82% (7 bn AZN).

Telecommunications

In the 21st century, a new oil and gas boom helped to improve the situation in Azerbaijan's science and technology sectors, and the government launched a campaign aimed at modernization and innovation. The government estimates that profits from the information technology and communication industry will grow and become comparable with those from oil production.

Azerbaijan has a large and steadily growing Internet sector, mostly uninfluenced by the financial crisis of 2007–2008; rapid growth is forecast for at least five more years.

The country has also been making progress in developing its telecoms sector. The Ministry of Communications & Information Technologies (MCIT), as well as being an operator through its role in Aztelekom, is both a policy-maker and regulator. Public payphones are available for local calls and require the purchase of a token from the telephone exchange or some shops and kiosks. Tokens allow a call of indefinite duration. As of 2009, there were 1,397,000 main telephone lines and 1,485,000 internet users. There are five GSM providers: Azercell, Bakcell, Azerfon (Nar Mobile), Aztrank, Catel mobile network operators and one CDMA.

Tourism

Tourism is an important part of the economy of Azerbaijan. The country was a well-known tourist spot in the 1980s. However, the fall of the Soviet Union, and the First Nagorno-Karabakh War during the 1988–1994 period, damaged the tourist industry and the image of Azerbaijan as a tourist destination.

It was not until the 2000s that the tourism industry began to recover, and the country has since experienced a high rate of growth in the number of tourist visits and overnight stays. In recent years, Azerbaijan has also become a popular destination for religious, spa, and health care tourism. During winter, the Shahdag Winter Complex offers skiing.

The government of Azerbaijan has set the development of Azerbaijan as an elite tourist destination a top priority. It is a national strategy to make tourism a major, if not the single largest, contributor to the Azerbaijani economy. These activities are regulated by the State Tourism Agency and the Ministry of Culture.
The Formula One Grand Prix is held in Baku, the capital city and has been held here for years.

Currency system

The Azerbaijani manat is the currency of Azerbaijani, denominated as the manat, subdivided into 100 qapik. The manat is issued by the Central Bank of Azerbaijan, the monetary authority of Azerbaijan. The ISO 4217 abbreviation is AZN.

The manat is held in a floating exchange-rate system managed primarily against the US dollar. The rate of exchange (Azerbaijani manat per US$1) for 28 January 2016, was AZN 1.60.

There is a complex relationship between Azerbaijan's balance of trade, inflation, measured by the consumer price index and the value of its currency. Despite allowing the value of the manat to "float", Azerbaijan's central bank has decisive ability to control its value with relationship to other currencies.

Infrastructure

Energy
 

Two-thirds of Azerbaijan is rich in oil and natural gas. The region of the Lesser Caucasus accounts for most of the country's gold, silver, iron, copper, titanium, chromium, manganese, cobalt, molybdenum, complex ore and antimony. In September 1994, a 30-year contract was signed between the State Oil Company of Azerbaijan Republic (SOCAR) and 13 oil companies, among them Amoco, BP, ExxonMobil, Lukoil and Statoil. As Western oil companies are able to tap deepwater oilfields untouched by the Soviet exploitation, Azerbaijan is considered one of the most important spots in the world for oil exploration and development. Meanwhile, the State Oil Fund of Azerbaijan was established as an extra-budgetary fund to ensure the macroeconomic stability, transparency in the management of oil revenue, and the safeguarding of resources for future generations.

Azeriqaz, a sub-company of SOCAR, intends to ensure full gasification of the country by 2021.

Transportation

The convenient location of Azerbaijan on the crossroad of major international traffic arteries, such as the Silk Road and the south–north corridor, highlights the strategic importance of the transportation sector for the country's economy. The transport sector in the country includes roads, railways, aviation, and maritime transport.

Azerbaijan is also an important economic hub in the transportation of raw materials. The Baku-Tbilisi-Ceyhan pipeline (BTC) became operational in May 2006 and extends more than 1,774 kilometers through the territories of Azerbaijan, Georgia and Turkey. The BTC is designed to transport up to 50 million tons of crude oil annually and carries oil from the Caspian Sea oilfields to global markets. The South Caucasus Pipeline, also stretching through the territory of Azerbaijan, Georgia and Turkey, became operational at the end of 2006 and offers additional gas supplies to the European market from the Shah Deniz gas field.  Shah Deniz is expected to produce up to 296 billion cubic meters of natural gas per year. Azerbaijan also plays a major role in the EU-sponsored Silk Road Project.

In 2002, the Azerbaijani government established the Ministry of Transport with a broad range of policy and regulatory functions. In the same year, the country became a member of the Vienna Convention on Road Traffic. The highest priority being; upgrading the transport network and transforming transportation services into one of the key comparative advantages of the country, as this would be highly conducive to the development of other sectors of the economy.

In 2012, the construction of Kars–Tbilisi–Baku railway expected to provide transportation between Asia and Europe through connecting the railways of China and Kazakhstan in the east with Turkey's Marmaray to the European railway system in the west. By 2010, there were 35 airports and one heliport.

Regulation
Single window system shares needed information through a single gateway with all organizations serving in trade field, as well as abolishes useless processes and raises the effectiveness of cooperation among different parties. 73 economies implement single window system in the world. Azerbaijan started to implement this system in 2009. It implemented an E-Government portal as well.

A single-window system was established by a decree of the Azerbaijani President issued in 2007, 30 April, in order to simplify export-import procedures, innovate customs services, and improve the trade environment. According to the decree, Ministry of Justice, Ministry of Economic Development, Ministry of Taxes, Ministry of Labor and Social Protection, State Social Protection Fund, and State Statistics Committee should present a proposal on the organization of entrepreneurial activities by single registration body based on single window principle.

The president appointed the State Customs Committee as the leading body of controlling goods and transportation passing through the borders of the country in 2008.

A "single authority principle" requires customs officials to be more responsible in dealing with all types of border control operations for other authorities. The Netherlands and Sweden were the countries of which practice studied. A "single system" works on and then shares standardized information accumulated from traders to all entities taking part in international trade. The practice of US was explored in this phase. An "automated system" provides a single electronic statement to responsible agencies submitted by traders to be worked on and confirmed, and after that, these authorities send electronic confirmations and announcements. In this case, practice of Mauritius and Singapore was studied.

The Customs Committee formed a commission to realize the new system. Ministry of Agriculture, Ministry of Healthcare, Ministry of Internal Affairs, Ministry of Taxes, Ministry of Transportation, Central Bank, State Road Police, State Committee for Standardization, Metrology and Patents, State Maritime Administration were selected as important agencies to implement single window system along with the State Customs Committee. The government supported Customs Committee in preparing its staff to deal with the new system by improving recruitment of local customs offices, providing with software and hardware upgrades for the system.

Azerbaijani government supports financially single window system. In the first phase, the government realized customs clearance system on the process of border crossing to country beginning from 1 January 2009. This system was free to all users. Then it was expanded to Baku and Sumgayit in 2011. Customs code of the Republic of Azerbaijan was amended based on the inclusion of the article on single window system which became operative on 1 January 2012. After this amendment, all of Azerbaijan's 29 customs checkpoints started to implement new single window system.

According to the Presidential Decree (11 November 2008), the "single window" principle started to be applied from 1 January 2009 on the inspection of goods and transportation at the border checkpoints. Customs Committee established a commission working on the implementation of "single window" principle in customs agencies on 18 November 2008 based on the Presidential Decree of 11 November 2008. Technological scheme determining the sequence of issuance of "permit" certificates was approved by the Customs Committee on 22 December 2009. Scheme provided customs officers to issue "permit" certificates at border checkpoints to vehicles, which perform customs, veterinary, photo-sanitary and sanitary quarantine control activities and international automobile transportation in accordance with legislation.

The State Migration Service issues appropriate permits for foreigners and stateless persons coming to Azerbaijan to live and work on legal grounds, simplifying the procedure of their registration at the place of residence, and ensuring transparency in these processes. The "single window" principle has been applied on migration management processes starting from 1 July 2009 according to the Decree.

Business environment
As of October 2014, Azerbaijan holds the highest foreign investment per capita among the Commonwealth of Independent States (CIS) countries. Germany, for example, has invested approximately $760 million into the Azerbaijani economy, and approximately 177 German companies operate within Azerbaijan. Since gaining its independence, companies have invested $174 billion into Azerbaijan. Foreign investment accounts for around half of that amount.

In 2008, Azerbaijan was cited as the top reformer by the World Bank's Doing Business report:
According to World Bank's Doing Business report 2019, Azerbaijan improved its position in the Ease of doing business rank from 57 to 25, as well as ranked 4th among the top 10 improvers. Implementing a record number of reforms mainly involving institutional changes have made it easier to do business in Azerbaijan in 2017–2018 period, as a result time and cost to get construction permit reduced significantly (time by 80 days and cost by 12.563 AZN), process of connecting electricity grid rationalized, as well as getting credit simplified.

Other economic indicators
Data from CIA World Factbook unless noted otherwise

Investment (gross fixed)
17% of GDP (2011 est.)

Household income or consumption by percentage share
 lowest 10%: 3.4%
 highest 10%: 27.4% (2008)

Inflation rate (consumer prices)
1.1% (2012 est.)

Agriculture
 utilized agricultural land:  (2011)
 total wood resources: 144,2 million cubic metres
 crops: cotton, grain, rice, grapes, fruit, vegetables, tea, tobacco
 livestock products: beef, mutton, poultry, milk, eggs

Industrial production growth rate
-3% (2011 est.)

Electricity
 production: 22,55 billion kWh (2008)
 consumption: 18,8 billion kWh (2008)
 exports: 812 million kWh (2008)
 imports: 596 million kWh (2008)

Current account balance
 $11,12 billion (2011 est.)

Exports commodities
 petroleum and natural gas, petroleum products, oilfield equipment; steel, iron ore, cement; chemicals, petrochemicals, textiles, machinery, cotton, foodstuffs.

Reserves of foreign exchange and gold
 $7,146 billion (2011 est.)

Debt external
 $3.89 billion (2011 est.)

Currency
 1 Manat = 100 gepik

Exchange rates
 Azerbaijani manat per US dollar 1.7 (for 22 November 2020)
 Azerbaijani manat per Euro 2.01 (for 22 November 2020)

Fiscal year
 Calendar year

See also

 Azerbaijan and the International Monetary Fund
 List of companies of Azerbaijan
 Baku-Tbilisi-Ceyhan pipeline
 State Oil Company of Azerbaijan
 Petroleum industry in Azerbaijan
 Agriculture in Azerbaijan
 Tourism in Azerbaijan
 Baku
 Military of Azerbaijan
 Judiciary of Azerbaijan

References

Further reading
 Habibov, Nazim: "Poverty in Azerbaijan" in the Caucasus Analytical Digest No. 34

External links
 
 Hübner, Gerald: "As If Nothing Happened? How Azerbaijan's Economy Manages to Sail Through Stormy Weather" in the Caucasus Analytical Digest No. 18

 
Azerbaijan